McCurey Hercules "Herkie" Walls (born July 18, 1961) is a former professional American football wide receiver in the National Football League and Arena Football League. Walls is currently the head coach for the Orlando Predators of the National Arena League (NAL).

College career

At the 1980 Southwest Texas Indoor Track and Field Championship, Walls finished first ahead of Curtis Dickey and Carl Lewis in the 60-yard dash (55 meters).

Herkie Walls was a consensus choice as All-Southwest Conference split end as a senior in 1982, when he set all-time University of Texas records by averaging 28.08 yards on 25 catches for 702 yards and by scoring 10 touchdowns on pass receptions. His college career average of 25.8 yards per catch also was a Longhorn record. Herkie in 1982, also carried the ball on nine rushes for 146 yards, an average of 16.2 yards per carry, and returned six kickoffs for 154 yards, an average of 25.7 yards per return, for the SWC runner-up Longhorns, who posted a 9–2 record. He was drafted in 1983 by the Houston Oilers and played three seasons for the NFL team. As an Oiler, he caught 31 passes for 567 yards and two touchdowns and returned 36 kicks for 633 yards. While at Garland High School, Herkie was an option quarterback and as a senior led the Owls through an undefeated regular season to a bi-district championship, gaining 1,346 yards rushing in 12 games. Also an outstanding sprinter, Herkie as a sophomore ran on the Garland sprint relay team which won the State championship with a 41.0 time. As a junior he won the district 100-yard dash in 9.6 and the 220 in 22.1. In the District 10-AAAA meet as a senior, he repeated his three victories, winning the 100 in 9.45, the 220 in 21.76, and anchoring the winning sprint relay, plus he added the long jump title. Herkie also won the high school 100 meters in a record time of 10.42 at the Texas Relays as a senior. Competing later in track for the Longhorns, Herkie won third place in the SWC meet 200 meters in both 1981 and 1982 and was sixth in the 100 meters in 1982.

Professional career

Walls was a 7th round pick in the 1983 NFL Draft out of the University of Texas by the Houston Oilers. He played in the 1983–1985 seasons for the Oilers. He then played in two games in the 1985 season for the Tampa Bay Buccaneers.

Coaching career
On September 16, 2022, Walls was hired as the Head coach for the Orlando Predators of the National Arena League (NAL).

Personal life

Walls now resides in Orlando, Florida and is a boys' Bible teacher. He is a former head football coach for The Master's Academy in Oviedo, Florida.

References

External links
Herkie Walls at Pro Football Referebce
Herkie Walls at Arena Fan

1961 births
Living people
People from Garland, Texas
Garland High School alumni
American football wide receivers
Texas Longhorns football players
Houston Oilers players
Tampa Bay Buccaneers players
Orlando Predators players
High school football coaches in Florida
National Football League replacement players